Ghani Parwaz is an author from Turbat, Balochistan, in Pakistan. He was born on 15 August 1945, in the village of Nizarabad, Tehsil Tump, in the District of Kech. His father, Haji Muhammad Ibrahim, was a trader, contractor, and landlord. Ghani Parwaz had no interest in the occupations of his father. This led him to do double M.A, Balochi Fazul, and BEd, and then take teaching as his occupation. He was school teacher and headmaster for ten years, and served for 24 years as college lecturer, professor, and principal. He is also a well known Human rights champion and the Coordinator of Human Rights Commission of Pakistan (HRCP) Regional Office, Turbat, Makuran.

Ghani Parwaz was interested in literature from his childhood. His literary works include poetry, short stories, novels, plays, research, criticism, travelogue, translation, and others. He has written approximately 100 books, and 40 books have been published.

He has received regional, provincial and national awards including, "The Presidential Award for the Pride of Performance."

Ghani Parwaz is the founder of the feminist movement in Makuran.
He is the founding president of two literary organizations; "Labzanki Karwan", Turbat (Literary Caravan), and Balochistan Academy, Turbat, as well as being the only Secretary (Head) of Literary Alliance "Labzanki Chagerd", Turbat (Literary Society, Turbat).

Major works

Novels:
 Mehr ay Hosham (A Craving for Love) (2000)
 Shapjaten Raahi (Night-bitten Traveler) (2007)
 Mehr o Humrahi (Love and Companionship) (2011)
 Aas Alwat kanaan enth  (The Fire is Whispering) (2016)
 Maah-e-sar o Rooch-e-cher (Under the Sun and Over the Moon) (2017)

Short story collections:
 Saankal (Handcuffs) (1992)
 Be Manzilen Musaper (Traveller without a Destination) (1995)
 Mehr Pa Baha Gept nabit (Love cannot be bought) (1997)
 Murtagen Mard ay Pachen cham (Open eyes of a dead man) (2001)
 Thoda Sa Paani (Just a Little Water) (2002)
 Jangal (Forest) (2004)
 Banden Cham kay pach bant (When closed eyes open) (2008)
 Dil ke Saharay (The Supports of Heart) (2009)
 Sarshap ay Marg (Death of Early Night) (2010)
 Dil Mehr Musaper Menzel (Heart, Love, Traveler, Destination) (2012)
 Distagen Waab o Nadesthagen Maana (Seen Dreams and Unseen Meanings) (2021)

Non-fiction books:
 Maoism kya hai? (What is Maoism?) (1986)
 Insaan aur Ikhlakiaat (Man and Ethics) (1987)
 Labzanki Shargedaari (Literary Criticism) (1997)
 Fiction O Ai Ay Tekneek (Fiction and its Techniques) (2009)
 Noken Raah (The New Path) (2013)
 Waabani Dawaar (The Dream Land) (2016)
 Afkaar-e-Alam (Universal Thoughts) (2017)
 Har Daur Ka Falsafa (Philosophy of Every Age) (2018)\
 Yatani Darya Chol Jant (The Waves of Memory) (2021)

Poetry:
 Mosam Inth Wadaarani  (The Waiting Season) (1998)
 Kassi Nahan Maten watan  (I'm No One's Motherland) (2001)

Compilations:

 Kaarwaan 1 (Caravan 1) (1986)
 Kaarwaan 2 (Caravan 2) (1987)
 Kaarwaan 3 (Caravan 3) (1988)
 Kaarwaan 4 (Caravan 4) (1989)
 Kaarwaan 5 (Caravan 5) (1990)
 Aadenk 1 (Mirror 1) (1995)

Awards 

From Pakistan Academy of Letters, Islamabad:

 1992 – for first short story collection Saankal (Handcuffs) - National Prize "Mast Taukali Award" 
 1997 - for first Balochi critical compilation Labzanki Shargedaari (Literary Criticism) - National Prize "Mast Taukali Award" 
 1998 - for first Balochi poetry compilation, Mosam int Wadaarani (The Waiting Season) – National Prize "Mast Taukali Award"
 2017 - for the novel Maah-e-sar o Rooch-e-cher (Under the Sun and Over the Moon) – "Sayad Zahoor Shah Hashmi Award"

From the Information Department Balochistan, Quetta:

 2001 – for short story compilation Murtagen Mard ay Pachen Cham (Open Eyes of a Dead Man) – "Provincial Award"

From Culture and Tourism Department Balochistan, Quetta:

 2007 – for the second Balochi novel Shap Jaten Raahi (The Night-bitten Traveler) "Provincial Award" 
 2008 – for the fifth Balochi Short story compilation Banden Cham Kay Pach Bant (When closed eyes open) "Provincial Award" 
 2009 – for the second critical compilation Fiction o aaiye tekneek (Fiction and It’s Techniques) "Provincial Award" 
 2010 – for the sixth short story compilation Sar Shap ay Marg (Death of Early Night) "Provincial Award" 
 2011 – for the third Balochi novel Mehr o Humrahi (Love and Companionship) "Provincial Award"  
 2013 – for the third critical compilation Noken Rah (The New Path) "Provincial Award" 
 2016 – for the fourth Balochi novel Aas Alwat Kanan Int (The Fire is Whispering) "Provincial Award" 
 2017 – for the fifth novel Maah-e-sar o Rooch-e-cher (Under the Sun and Over the Moon)''' "Provincial Award Allama Iqbal Award"

Presidential Award:

 2010 – for Pride of Performance for all literary works by the author

From Balochi Department, Balochistan University, Quetta:

 2016 – Life Achievement Award or Commitment Award for all literary works

From Sayad Reference Library, Karachi:

 2020 – Saba Dashtiari Award for all literary works by the author

From Pakistan Academy of Letters, Islamabad, Indus Cultural Forum, and UNDP (United Nations Development Programme):

 2022 – Life Achievement Award for all literary works by the author

References

1945 births
Living people
Pakistani writers
People from Kech District